Claude Michel (born 24 April 1971) is a retired French football midfielder.

Career

Michel started his career with EA Guingamp.

References

1971 births
Living people
French footballers
En Avant Guingamp players
Association football midfielders
Ligue 1 players
Ligue 2 players